Tchaikovsky's Wife is a 2022 Russian biographical drama film written and directed by Kirill Serebrennikov, starring Alyona Mikhaylova and Odin Biron. The film is a participant in the competition program of the 2022 Cannes Film Festival.

Premise 
Set in the Russian Empire during the second half of the 19th century, the film is about the wife of the composer Pyotr Ilyich Tchaikovsky. She cannot accept her husband's homosexuality and as a result, gradually loses her mind.

Cast 
 Alyona Mikhaylova as Antonina Miliukova, Tchaikovsky's wife
 Odin Biron as Pyotr Ilyich Tchaikovsky
 Yuliya Aug as a crazy old woman
 Miron Fyodorov as Nikolai Rubinstein
 Alexander Gorchilin as Anatoliy Brandukov
 Filipp Avdeyev as a doctor
 Varvara Shmykova
 Vladimir Mishukov as Shlykov
 Andrey Burkovsky as Vladimir Meshchersky
 Maksim Emelyanov
 Ekaterina Ermishina
 Viktor Khorinyak as Peter Jurgenson

Release 
The film was presented at the 75th Cannes Film Festival's main competition on May 18, 2022 (Day 2). In the context of the ongoing Russian invasion of Ukraine, European Film Academy president Agnieszka Holland criticised the decision to screen a Russian film at the Cannes' main competition, noting that Kirill Serebrennikov "used [the film's festival press conference] to praise a Russian oligarch and compare the tragedy of Russian soldiers to Ukrainian defenders. I would not give him such a chance at this very moment".

Reception 
Film critic Zinaida Pronchenko negatively assessed the film: "One continuous ridiculous metaphor of the Russian world".

Tchaikovsky's Wife has an approval rating of 83% on review aggregator website Rotten Tomatoes, based on 23 reviews, and an average rating of 6.2/10. Metacritic assigned the film a weighted average score of 49 out of 100, based on 9 critics, indicating "mixed or average reviews".

See also 
 List of Russian films of 2022

References

External links 
 

2022 films
Films directed by Kirill Serebrennikov
2020s Russian-language films
2022 biographical drama films
Russian biographical drama films
Films set in the Russian Empire
Cultural depictions of Pyotr Ilyich Tchaikovsky
Films about classical music and musicians
2020s avant-garde and experimental films
Russian LGBT-related films